Arkeita Smith (born 28 February 1978) is a former Bermudian woman cricketer. She played for Bermuda at the 2008 Women's Cricket World Cup Qualifier.

References

External links 

1978 births
Living people
Bermudian women cricketers